Prigozhin or Prigogine is a masculine East Slavic surname.

People 

 Alexandre Prigogine (1913–1991), Russian-born Belgian ornithologist
  (1914–1999), Soviet/Ukrainian scientist and engineer
 Ilya Prigogine (1917–2003), Russian-born Belgian physicist noted for his work on dissipative structures, complex systems, and irreversibility
 Iosif Prigozhin (born 1969), Russian music producer
  (1926–1994), Soviet composer
 Yevgeny Prigozhin (born 1961), Russian warlord with close ties to Vladimir Putin and the Wagner Group

See also 

 11964 Prigogine, a minor planet named for Ilya Prigogine
 Prigogine's theorem, a theorem of thermodynamics of non-equilibrium processes formulated by Ilya Prigogine

References 

East Slavic-language surnames
Ukrainian-language surnames
Russian-language surnames